Shri Hiphei (23 August 1937 – 8 April 2020) was an Indian politician from Mizoram.

Political career
Hiphei began his political career with the Mara Freedom Party in September 1963. He was then elected to the state assembly from  the Tuipang constituency as an independent in 1972 and was made deputy speaker.

Between 1972 and 2013, he won Mizoram Assembly elections seven times; 1972, 1978, 1979, 1984, 1987, 1989 and 2013.

He joined the Janata Party in 1978 and then in 1984 switched his affiliation to the Indian National Congress.

He was elected to the upper house of India's Parliament, the Rajya Sabha, for two terms, from 1990 to 1996 and from 1996 to 2002, as a member of the Indian National Congress. He served as the Speaker of Mizoram Legislative Assembly from 1989 to 1990, and from 2013 until 5 November 2018, but, resigned from the post and joined the Bharatiya Janata Party a few hours later.

Death
Hiphei died in Aizawl on 8 April 2020 following a long illness.  He was 82.

See also
List of Rajya Sabha members from Mizoram

References

Rajya Sabha members from Mizoram
Speakers of the Mizoram Legislative Assembly
1937 births
2020 deaths
People from Saiha district
Mizo people
Mizoram MLAs 1984–1987
Mizoram MLAs 1987–1989
Mizoram MLAs 1989–1993
Mizoram MLAs 2013–2018
Mizoram MLAs 1972–1977
Mizoram MLAs 1978–1979
Deaths from the COVID-19 pandemic in India